Last Song in Paris  (in Chinese 偶然) is a 1986 Hong Kong romance film written and directed by Chor Yuen and starring Leslie Cheung, Anita Mui, Joey Wong and Cecilia Yip

Plot
Louie (Leslie Cheung), a spoiled pop star, has a one-night stand with beautiful dancer, Anita (Anita Mui). When Anita tells Louie that she dreamed of becoming a singer, he brings her to the stage and becomes a star. Anita has fallen in love with Louie, but Louie loves Julia (Joey Wong). However, Louie later finds out that Julia is dating his father, Kent (Paul Chu). Louie then leaves Hong Kong and heads to Paris leaving his career behind. Then he meets, Yuan Yu-shih (Cecilia Yip), a Vietnamese refugee that suffers from a war wound. In Paris, Louie lives his new life happily as a dishwasher with his new lover. However, his past life starts to come back when Anita comes to pay a visit.

Cast
 Leslie Cheung - Louie.
 Anita Mui - Anita Chow.
 Joey Wong - Julia.
Cecilia Yip - Yuan Yu-shih.
 Paul Chu - Kent.
 Tin Ching - Mr. Hsu.
 Charlie Cho - Charlie.
 Hung Nam as Chin Mei.
 Benz Hui - David.
Ho Pak-kwong - Man servant.

Box office 
The film grossed  at the Hong Kong box office.

References

External links

Last Song in Paris at Hong Kong Cinemagic

 Last Song in Paris at tcm.com

1986 films
1986 romantic drama films
Hong Kong romantic drama films
1980s Cantonese-language films
Films about singers
Films directed by Chor Yuen
Films set in Hong Kong
Films set in Paris
Films shot in Hong Kong
Films shot in Paris
1980s Hong Kong films